Matiltan Hydropower Project is a proposed run-of-the-river hydro-power generation project which is located in the Gorkin Matiltan region of Kalam valley, District Swat, Khyber Pakhtunkhwa province of Pakistan, on the left tributary of Suvastu River. The power station has a planned generating capacity of 84 MW.

Construction 
In October 2020, the project was estimated to be 47 percent complete.
The project has faced obstructive tactics from various government factions in an attempt to delay the project.

References

Hydroelectric power stations in Pakistan
Proposed hydroelectric power stations
Proposed renewable energy power stations in Pakistan